Willow City is an unincorporated community in Gillespie County, Texas, United States. According to the Handbook of Texas, the community had an estimated population of 75 in 2000. The 1905 Willow City School was added to the National Register of Historic Places in Texas on May 6, 2005.

Geography
Willow City is located at  (30.4007508, -98.7014248). It is situated along FM 1323 in northeastern Gillespie County, approximately 12 miles northeast of Fredericksburg.

Climate
The climate in this area is characterized by hot, humid summers and generally mild to cool winters.  According to the Köppen Climate Classification system, Willow City has a humid subtropical climate, abbreviated "Cfa" on climate maps.

History
The area was first settled before the American Civil War, and it became a gathering point for English-speaking settlers in Gillespie County, mostly inhabited by German speaking settlers around and after the War. Named simply "Willow" in 1877 when the post office was established, the growing community became "Willow City" ten years later. At the turn of the century, Willow City was home to 132 inhabitants, but this number dropped steadily since then, going as low as 17 in 1964 before settling around 75 since the 1970s.

Willow City was home to the Alfred Pfeil Gin, in which a boiler exploded September 2, 1924, killing two people. The walls of one end of the building were blown out, and one end of the boiler was found more than a hundred yards away. Farmer Edgar P. Smith was killed instantly and hurled about 50 yards. His nude body, missing its legs, was found in the creek. Walter M. Icke was found near the original site of the boiler and died shortly after medical assistance arrived.

Willow has a post office with the ZIP code 78675.

On December 15, 1847, a petition was submitted to create Gillespie County. In 1848, the legislature formed Gillespie County from Bexar and Travis counties. While the signers were overwhelmingly German immigrants, names also on the petition were Castillo, Pena, Munos, and a handful of non-German Anglo names.

See also
Crabapple
Loyal Valley
Cherry Spring
Sisterdale

References

External links

Friends of Gillespie County Schools, Willow City

Unincorporated communities in Gillespie County, Texas
Unincorporated communities in Texas